The name Hina has been used to name two tropical cyclones in the South Pacific Ocean and one in the South-West Indian Ocean.

In the South Pacific:
Cyclone Hina (1985)
Cyclone Hina (1997)
After the 1996–97 season, the name Hina was retired and replaced with the name Haley.

In the South-West Indian:
Tropical Storm Hina (2009)

Hina